A constitutional referendum was scheduled to be held in Myanmar (Burma) in May 2015. If approved, the proposed reforms would have come into effect after the general elections in November. After most of the proposed amendments to the constitution were discarded, the referendum was postponed.

Electoral system
Proposed changes to the Constitution of Myanmar must be approved by at least 75% of both houses of the Assembly of the Union before going to a referendum. When the referendum is held, the changes must be approved by at least 50% of the registered voters, rather than 50% of those voting.

Referendum bill
The proposed constitutional amendment bill was discussed at the Assembly of the Union from 23 to 25 June 2015. Amendments were confined to four key clauses.  
Article 436 for amending the constitution be lowered from its current figure of more than 75 percent to at least 70 percent of votes, which would have ended the effective veto of the military
Articles 59 and 60 for presidency qualifications which bars opposition leader Aung San Suu Kyi from the presidency
Article 418(b) for military’s role in the state of emergency is declared

The Assembly of the Union voted against most of the constitutional amendments on 25 June, ensuring that the military's veto power remained intact and that Aung San Suu Kyi could not become president in the 2015 general elections. The result was no surprise given that 25% of the seats in the Assembly are, by law, held by the military. The proposal aimed to reduce the vote share needed to amend the constitution to 70%. The Assembly of the Union approved only a minor change to article 59(d).

Cancellation
The Union Election Commission requested to delay the referendum in July 2015 because it concerned only a minor change to article 59(d). On 22 July, the Assembly of the Union voted to postpone the referendum.

References

2015 in Myanmar
Referendums in Myanmar
Cancelled referendums
Constitutional referendums